Willughbeia edulis is a vine species bearing tropical fruit in the family Apocynaceae.

Etymology 
The tropical plant genus Willughbeia all commemorate Francis Willughby, English ornithologist and ichthyologist. Edulis comes from the Latin, which translates as edible. In fact, it is one of the rare climbing plants of Southeast Asia of which the fruits are eatable.

Description 
It is a yellow sour edible fruit found in: India, Indo-China (Cambodia, Myanmar, and Isan (northeastern) with Chanthaburi Province of Thailand as well as Vietnam) include Peninsular Malaysia.  It may be known under a number of synonyms including "Willughbeia cochinchinensis". 

After its reddish lenticelled stems are excised, they exude a milky latex which produces a rubber called chittagong. The roots can be used as a red dye and it may be used medicinally in parts of Asia including Cambodia.

Vernacular names

 in Indonesia refers to a similar edible relative, W. sarawacensis.

References

External links
 W. Plant Data: Edulis (Thai)

edulis
Tropical fruit
Flora of Assam (region)
Flora of Bangladesh
Flora of Indo-China
Flora of Peninsular Malaysia
Fruits originating in Asia
Plants described in 1820